Talk op Platt was a German television series.

See also
List of German television series

Norddeutscher Rundfunk
1982 German television series debuts
2006 German television series endings
1990s German television series
German television talk shows
German-language television shows
Das Erste original programming
Low German